Leonardo Fabbri (born 15 April 1997) is an Italian shot putter. He competed at the 2020 Summer Olympics, in Shot put.

Biography

In winter 2019, at 22 years, his explosion, with 16th world best measure (his personal best 20.69 m) in the world top lists IAAF and the qualification at the 2019 European Athletics Indoor Championships.

Statistics

National records
 Shot put (under-23): 20.99 m,  Vicenza, 19 July 2019 – Current holder

Personal best
Outdoor
Shot put: 21.99 m,  Padua, 30 August 2020

Indoor
Shot put: 21.59 m,  Stockholm, 24 January 2020

Progression

Achievements

National titles
Fabbri won 7 national championships at individual senior level.
 Italian Athletics Championships
 Shot put: 2019, 2020 (2)
 Italian Athletics Indoor Championships
Shot put: 2018, 2019, 2020, 2021, 2023 (5)

See also
 Italian all-time lists - Shot put

Notes

References

External links
 

1997 births
Living people
Italian male shot putters
Athletics competitors of Centro Sportivo Aeronautica Militare
People from Bagno a Ripoli
World Athletics Championships athletes for Italy
Italian Athletics Championships winners
Athletes (track and field) at the 2018 Mediterranean Games
Mediterranean Games competitors for Italy
Athletes (track and field) at the 2020 Summer Olympics
Olympic athletes of Italy
Sportspeople from the Metropolitan City of Florence